WWWJ may refer to:

 WJYL-CD, a low-power television station (channel 16) licensed to serve Jeffersonville, Indiana, United States, which held the call sign WWWJ-CD in 2017
 WCGX, a radio station (1360 AM) licensed to serve Galax, Virginia, United States, which held the call sign WWWJ from 1997 to 2016